The horse guard wasp (Stictia carolina) is a type of sand wasp (Bembicini) from the eastern United States which preys primarily upon horse-flies (Tabanidae).
It is a large, colorful, fast-flying wasp, one of 28 species in the genus Stictia (which occur throughout North and South America), all of which have similar biology.

Biology

A female wasp of this species may take anywhere from 30 to 60 flies as food to provision each one of her nests; she makes a new nest for every egg she lays. Nests are simple burrows some 15 cm deep, with a single enlarged chamber at the bottom. An egg is laid in the empty chamber, and the female wasp brings back paralyzed flies and sometimes silver-spotted skipper larvae until the chamber is full (mass provisioning), at which point she closes the nest and begins another. Numerous females often excavate nests within a small area where the soil is suitable, creating large and sometimes very dense nesting aggregations. Nearly all the prey are biting female horse-flies; exceptionally, other flies such as Odontomyia and the screw-worm fly Cochliomyia are taken.

Horses and cattle are not disturbed by the presence of the horse guard wasp, despite its rapid flight and loud buzzing; the same animals may however respond strongly to horse-flies or bot flies. Nonetheless, these beneficial wasps are sometimes eliminated by horse owners unfamiliar with them, thus exacerbating their problems with horse-flies.

The horse guard wasp acts as a natural biological control, helping to keep horse fly populations down. This makes it important to the economies of those areas where horses are reared; in the words of Bohart and Menke, it "fully lives up to its name".

The generic name "Stictia" may be related to Ancient Greek "stictis" which means "spotted"; the specific name "carolina" is a reference to the eastern American state to which this species is native. It occurs from the 100th meridian eastwards, and as far north as Pennsylvania.

References 

Crabronidae
Biological pest control wasps
Hymenoptera of North America
Insects described in 1793